This list ranks the largest retail companies, according to the international consulting firm Deloitte.

By revenue 
Companies are ordered by revenue from retail operations in millions of US Dollars in FY 2020. Carrefour S.A. was excluded from 2020's report at the company’s request. The list does not include Wakefern Food Corporation with revenue of US$16.3 billion in 2017.

References 

Lists of retailers
Retail
Economy-related lists of superlatives